
San Lorenzo Lake is a lake in the Beni Department around central Bolivia. East of the city of Trinidad the lake sits at an elevation of 178 m, its surface area is 26.2 km².

Lakes of Beni Department